Hamdard Laboratories may refer to:

 Hamdard India
 Hamdard Pakistan
 Hamdard Bangladesh